The 1912–13 Scottish Division One season was won by Rangers by four points over nearest rival Celtic.

League table

Results

References

1912–13 Scottish Football League
Scottish Division One seasons
Scottish